

Season summary
The 2009–10 Victoria Salmon Kings season is the Salmon Kings' 6th season in the ECHL. General Manager and Head Coach Mark Morrison returned for his third full season as bench boss, while former Salmon King, Ryan Wade returned for his second year as Assistant Coach.  The Salmon Kings would struggle in their first 10 games going 1-9-0-0, which placed them in last place of the National Conference standings and caused changes to their roster.

However, on November 11, the Salmon Kings went on a 22-6-3-0 run in their next 31 games heading towards the ECHL All-Star break, which made Victoria the hottest team in the ECHL by accumulating the most wins and points through the 67-day stretch.  The streak also included a 12-game overall winning streak and tying their previous club record with a 12-game home winning streak.  The goaltending in the middle of season would see Glenn Fisher, along with three Abbotsford Heat netminders – David Shantz, Matt Keetley, and Leland Irving rotating starts, while Chad Painchaud, Olivier Latendresse and Wes Goldie led the offensive-attack during the stretch run.  At the 2010 ECHL All-Star Game, goaltender, David Shantz was named as the starting goaltender for the National Conference, while defenceman and Victoria native, Taylor Ellington joined the roster.

After the All-Star break, the Salmon Kings hot-streak would progressively come to an end when the team encountered several impactful injuries and call-ups in the second half of the season.  The Salmon Kings would complete the season finishing with a 10-17-0-2 record and barely made the playoffs, finishing with a 34-32-4-2 and placing 7th in the National Conference standings.

In the Kelly Cup playoffs, the Salmon Kings would play against the Bakersfield Condors in the first round of the best-of-five series. Victoria would win Games 1 and 3 to take a 2-1 series lead, but was unable to finish the Condors off, losing in the fifth-and-deciding game with the game-winning goal coming in the final minute of regulation at Rabobank Arena.

The 2009-10 season produced many highlight moments and individual accomplishments.  On January 15, the Salmon Kings played in their 400th game in club history.  After that night, the trio of Adam Taylor, Scott Howes, and Dirk Southern combined for a highlight-reel goal vs. Bakersfield at Save-On-Foods Memorial Centre, which became known as "The Goal" and made TSN's Highlight of the Night .  In addition, the Salmon Kings also set franchise records such for most goals in a game (9) and fastest two goals (eight seconds apart).

Furthermore, the Salmon Kings players also accomplished notable individual achievements, as well.  On February 11, team captain Wes Goldie passed Ryan Wade's club record for most games played in a Salmon Kings uniform at 266 games. During this season, Chad Painchaud and Jimmy Sharrow broke a five-year-old club record by scoring points in 14 and 12 straight games respectively.  Painchaud would tie the franchise record goal scoring streak by scoring goals in five straight games, while veteran Olivier Filion would break the all-time club record with most games registering an assist doing so in seven games.  Lastly, Jimmy Sharrow was named as in the ECHL All-Second Team honors at the end of the season.

Standings

Division standings

Conference standings

Schedule and results

Regular season

Playoffs

Player stats

Skaters

Note: GP = Games played; G = Goals; A = Assists; Pts = Points; +/- = Plus/minus; PIM = Penalty minutes

Goaltenders
Note: GP = Games played; Min = Minutes played; W = Wins; L = Losses; OT = Overtime losses; SOL = Shootout losses; GA = Goals against; GAA= Goals against average; Sv% = Save percentage; SO= Shutouts

†Denotes player spent time with another team before joining Victoria. Stats reflect time with the Salmon Kings only. ‡Denotes player no longer with the team. Stats reflect time with Salmon Kings only.

Professional affiliations

Vancouver Canucks
The Salmon Kings' NHL affiliate based in Vancouver, British Columbia.

Manitoba Moose
The Salmon Kings' AHL affiliate based in Winnipeg, Manitoba.

Victoria Salmon Kings seasons
Victoria
Victoria